James Robert Nelson (born April 16, 1975) is a former American football linebacker in the National Football League. He played for the Green Bay Packers, the Minnesota Vikings, the Indianapolis Colts, and the Baltimore Ravens.

References

External links
 NFL.com player page

1975 births
Living people
American football linebackers
Baltimore Ravens players
Green Bay Packers players
Indianapolis Colts players
Minnesota Vikings players
Penn State Nittany Lions football players
People from Charles County, Maryland
Players of American football from Riverside, California
Players of American football from Maryland